Albert Harold Quie (born September 18, 1923) is an American politician who served in the U.S. House as the representative from Minnesota's 1st congressional district from 1958 until 1979. A member of the Republican Party, he went on to serve as governor of Minnesota from 1979 until 1983.

Quie was born on a farm outside of Dennison, Minnesota. After serving in the U.S. Navy during World War II as a fighter pilot, he graduated from nearby St. Olaf College. He went on to own and operate his family's dairy farm. In 1954, Quie was elected to the Minnesota Senate. Following the death of Rep. August Andresen in 1958, Quie was elected to serve as the U.S. Representative from Minnesota's 1st congressional district. He went on to be reelected ten times. In the 1978 Minnesota gubernatorial election, Quie defeated incumbent DFLer Rudy Perpich. He served one term as governor, choosing not to seek reelection in 1982.

Quie is currently the oldest living former governor of any U.S. state and the oldest living former member of the United States House of Representatives.

Early life and career
Quie was born on his family's farm near Dennison, Minnesota, in Rice County. Three of his grandparents were Norwegian immigrants. The farm on which he was born and grew up on had been first purchased by his great-grandfather upon returning to Minnesota from fighting in the Civil War. A third-generation dairy farmer, he grew up on the farm learning to ride horses. He attended grade schools in nearby Nerstrand, Minnesota and attended high school in Northfield, Minnesota. 

He served in the United States Navy during World War II as a fighter pilot. Upon the end of the world war and leaving active military service, Quie attended St. Olaf College in Northfield. He graduated in 1950 with a degree in political science. While attending St. Olaf, Quie met and married Minneapolis-native Gretchen Hansen.

Owning and operating his family's dairy farm, Quie became involved in local politics. He served as clerk of the school board and as the supervisor of the Rice County Soil Conservation District. In 1954 he was elected to the Minnesota Senate. He served from 1955 to 1958, representing the 18th District, which encompassed Rice County in the southeastern part of the state.

Service in Congress
In January of 1958, Representative August Andresen of Minnesota's 1st congressional district passed away. Running in a special election, Quie was elected to the U.S. House of Representatives. He went onto be reelected ten times.

During the 1960s, Quie became known for his work in creating Republican alternatives to President Lyndon B. Johnson's "Great Society" programs. He also built a reputation for being moderate on civil rights, voting for the Civil Rights Acts of 1960, 1964, and 1968, as well as the 24th Amendment to the U.S. Constitution and the Voting Rights Act of 1965. As a congressman, Quie also advocated for increased defense spending and voted against abortion-rights. He received high scores during his time in Congress from both liberal, conservative, and anti-abortion organizations.

Governor of Minnesota 

In 1978, Quie decided not to seek reelection to the U.S. House and instead chose to run for governor of Minnesota. He won the Republican endorsement and selected Bemidji school administrator Lou Wangberg as his running mate. He ran against incumbent DFLer Rudy Perpich, who, as lieutenant governor, assumed the position following the resignation of Wendell Anderson. Controversy over Gov. Anderson appointing himself to a vacant U.S. Senate seat, the Boundary Water Canoe Area Wilderness, and DFL infighting between idealogical factions propelled Quie to victory over the incumbent.

His 1978 victory was a part of what was later dubbed "Minnesota Massacre", a historically large wave of Republican wins in the state.

As governor, the severity of the early 1980s economic recession damaged state finances and consumed most of his tenure. Although he had championed tax cuts earlier in his term, due to the ensuing state budget crisis Quie had to make some tough and unpopular choices. With the DFL retaking control of the state legislature in the 1980 elections, Quie sparred with them over how to quell the growing deficit. After calling a special session and several days of debate, Quie agreed to sign a proposal that included tax increases and budget cuts. Although Quie claimed that he did not support the bill, he called it necessary to sign. His support of a Democratic budget raised questions from party activists over his leadership. Quie ultimately chose not to seek reelection in 1982. However, upon leaving office, the state had fixed its shortfall and had a surplus.

Consideration for Vice President 

In August of 1974, President Richard Nixon resigned from the presidency and Vice President Gerald Ford assumed the position. Looking to appoint a vice president, Ford sought recommendations for the office of Vice President from Congress. Quie was briefly considered for the position, with Senator Harold Hughes and Representative Lawrence Hogan writing to President Ford and recommending Quie for Vice President. Ford, who had previously served in the House, was good friends with Quie. However, Nelson Rockefeller was nominated instead.

Ronald Reagan also considered Quie as a possible Vice President candidate for the 1980 United States presidential election. During the selection process, The Washington Post noted that Reagan and his team were giving "serious attention" Quie. However, just as in 1974, Quie was passed over. This time in favor of George H. W. Bush.

Personal life
Quie is a devout Lutheran. Throughout his life, he has been known for his deep religious faith. Quie, along with other elected officials, helped Charles Colson, who was convicted in Watergate, rediscover Jesus while in prison. This was later, in 1978, turned into a movie. After leaving elected office Quie ran Prison Fellowship Ministries, an international Christian organization for prisoners founded by Colson. President Gerald Ford called him, “a diligent servant of God and of his fellow men". 

Quie’s great-grandfather joined the newly founded Republican Party and supported Abraham Lincoln for president in the 1860 United States presidential election. He is the oldest living former governor and oldest living former U.S. Representative. Quie married artist Gretchen Quie in 1948. Together they had 5 children. She died of Parkinson's disease on December 13, 2015, at the age of 88.

As of 2017, he lives in Wayzata, Minnesota in a senior living facility.

In popular culture
In Garrison Keillor's Lake Wobegon Days, Quie is said to be the first governor ever to set foot in the mythical town of Lake Wobegon, "slipping quietly away from his duties to attend a ceremony dedicating a plaque attached to the Statue of the Unknown Norwegian" and making a few remarks.

Quie was portrayed in the 1978 movie Born Again, about his and others religious work with Charles Colson, by actor Arthur Roberts.

Electoral history

Notelist

References

External links 

 Al Quie Congressional Papers.
 as Albert Quie
 as Al Quie

|-

|-

|-

|-

|-

 
|-

|-

1923 births
Living people
American Lutherans
United States Navy personnel of World War II
American people of Norwegian descent
Farmers from Minnesota
Lutherans from Minnesota
Republican Party governors of Minnesota
Military personnel from Minnesota
Republican Party Minnesota state senators
People from Dennison, Minnesota
Republican Party members of the United States House of Representatives from Minnesota
St. Olaf College alumni